Pseudagrion niloticum is a species of damselfly in the family Coenagrionidae. It is found in Egypt, Ethiopia, Kenya, Somalia, Sudan, and possibly Uganda. Its natural habitats are dry savanna, moist savanna, subtropical or tropical dry shrubland, subtropical or tropical moist shrubland, and rivers.

References

Coenagrionidae
Insects described in 1978
Taxonomy articles created by Polbot